Estark (also Romanized as Estarak; also known as Sirk) is a village in Kuhpayeh Rural District, in the Central District of Kashan County, Isfahan Province, Iran. At the 2006 census, its population was 1,441, in 424 families.

References 

Populated places in Kashan County